Utambar is a small village in Jodhpur District state in Rajasthan India.

References

Villages in Ratnagiri district